Crown City Studios was a  Recording Studio and Creative Space located in Pasadena, California that had been home to a variety of independent and major label recordings and other creative projects since 2004.

Many notable artists, producers, mixers, and engineers have worked at Crown City Studios. Music videos and television shows have been filmed at Crown City Studios.

In 2012, in conjunction with Make Music Pasadena, Crown City Studios launched "Crown City Sessions", a live in-studio video series, which featured The New Limb, Ozma, Robotanists, Torches, The Happy Hollows, The Lonely Wild, Mojo Stone, and The Well Pennies.

Crown City Studios was independently owned and operated by a Record Producer Eric Lilavois. It featured an extensive collection of analog and digital recording equipment, including a Solid State Logic AWS-900 Recording Console.

The studio featured a  live room, along with two isolation rooms, a spacious and relaxing lounge, and has a full kitchen.

Artists and producers who have worked out of Crown City Studios include My Chemical Romance, Atlas Genius, Saint Motel, Eric Lilavois, The Days In Between, He Is We, Finish Ticket, Phlying Saucer, Andrew DeWitt, Broadcast Station, Tor Hyams, Doran Danoff, Dan Zanes, Empire Theate, Graydon, Matt Miller, Danny T. Levin, Erin Rametta, Geoff Ott, Risers, The Ventriloquists, Jim Cosgrove, Amy Farris, Lenka, The Dustbowl Revival, Kyle Nicolaides, Phil Yates, Bob Dylan, Frequentscenes, Céleigh Chapman, and Double D Horns.

Notable recordings 

 Saint Motel - Voyeur
 Atlas Genius - When It Was Now
 Atlas Genius - Through The Glass EP
 The Dustbowl Revival - Carry Me Home
 Phil Yates - Tumble Stairs
 Broadcast Station - Broadcast Station
 Emily Holmes - The Arrival
 Frequentscenes - Living & Laughing: The Mind’s Eye in Passing
 Risers - Risers EP
 The Ventriloquists - Bailout!
 Eric Lilavois - "Lifted" - single
 Eric Lilavois - The Only Way
 My Chemical Romance - The Mad Gear and Missile Kid EP
 Phyling Saucer - Runaway EP
 Graydon - Graydon
 The Legend of Beaver Dam
 Jim Cosgrove - Swimming in Noodles
 Dan Zanes & Friends - Little Nut Tree
 Elliot Hilton - “Little Mascara” single
 Risers - Anglos EP
 Erin Rametta - In The Making
 The Days In Between - The Days In Between...
 The Days In Between - Help On The Way

Notes

Buildings and structures in Pasadena, California
Recording studios in California